Afia Asantewaa Asare-Kyei is a human rights lawyer and member of Meta's Oversight Board. She works as program manager for the Open Society Initiative for West Africa (OSIWA). Her areas of expertise include human rights, women's rights, criminal justice, access to information and media freedom issues on the African continent. She is a citizen of both Ghana and South Africa.

She studied law in the Centre for Human Rights at Pretoria University in South Africa. Before joining OSIWA, she previously worked for Save the Children and USAID. In March 2020, she was one of the three Africans appointed to sit on the Facebook Oversight Board.

References

External links
Afia A. ASARE KYEI biography at the Open Society Initiative for West Africa
Meet Afia Asantewaa Asare-Kyei, a Ghanaian, who sits on Facebook’s new Oversight Board, BF&T Online

Ghanaian women lawyers
Facebook Oversight Board members
Living people
University of Pretoria alumni
Year of birth missing (living people)